Marcos Gomes de Araujo, better known as Marquinhos (born 23 March 1976), is a former Brazilian footballer. He has spent his career playing mostly in the J1 League.

Biography
Marquinhos started his professional career in Spain with Segunda División side CD Ourense. Then he played with several Brazilian and Japanese teams. He became the J. League Top Scorer top scorer in the 2008 season with 21 goals to his name as Kashima Antlers won the title for the second year in a row.

Marquinhos was awarded J. League Most Valuable Player on 22 December 2008, becoming the second Antlers player to win the highest J.League award after former Brazilian star Jorginho.

On 22 January 2011, Marquinhos left Kashima to join Vegalta Sendai on a permanent deal but left that club on 9 April 2011, suffering emotional instability from the deadly earthquake and tsunami on 11 March. He played for Sendai in only one league match.

On 11 January 2012, Marquinhos returned to the Japanese League to sign with his former club Yokohama F. Marinos.

Club statistics

Awards and honours

Club
Yokohama F. Marinos
J1 League: 1
 2003

Kashima Antlers
J1 League: 3
 2007, 2008, 2009
Emperor's Cup: 1
 2007
Japanese Super Cup: 2
 2009, 2010

Individual
J.League Most Valuable Player: 1
 2008
J.League Top Scorer: 1
 2008
J.League Best XI: 1
 2008

References

External links

1976 births
Living people
Sportspeople from Mato Grosso do Sul
CD Ourense footballers
Coritiba Foot Ball Club players
Clube Atlético Mineiro players
Tokyo Verdy players
Yokohama F. Marinos players
JEF United Chiba players
Shimizu S-Pulse players
Kashima Antlers players
Vegalta Sendai players
Vissel Kobe players
J1 League Player of the Year winners
Campeonato Brasileiro Série A players
J1 League players
Expatriate footballers in Japan
Brazilian expatriate footballers
Brazilian footballers
Operário Ferroviário Esporte Clube players
Association football forwards